Mika Ahola (13 December 1974 – 15 January 2012) was a Finnish enduro rider and a five-time world champion. He was also a seven-time winner of the International Six Days Enduro (ISDE) World Trophy with Team Finland, and was the fastest overall in the competition in 1999, 2001 and 2002.

Ahola debuted in the World Enduro Championship in a Husqvarna in 1993, and became a regular title contender after joining the TM factory team in 1997. In 2001, he finished runner-up for the third time, after losing the final round in Sweden and the 500 cc world title to Anders Eriksson by 0.06 seconds and a single point, respectively. Ahola took three more wins than Eriksson, but a mechanical problem in the second round in Slovakia proved costly for his title chase. After another second placing in 2002 and a third in 2003, he briefly moved to Husqvarna until signing for Honda for the 2006 season, which saw him finish second to KTM's Samuli Aro in the E2 class.

In 2007, Ahola took seven wins and finished on the podium in all but one event, beating compatriot Aro and Yamaha's Johnny Aubert to finally win the world championship. For the 2008 season, he moved to the E1 class and took his second world title ahead of KTM's Iván Cervantes. Ahola went on to win a fourth consecutive title in 2010. In 2011, he moved to the E3 class and became the first rider to win the world championship in all the three current categories.

Ahola debuted in the Barcelona Indoor Enduro in 2003, resulting fourth. He ended fourth again in 2004 and fifth in 2006. The rider entered the FIM Indoor Enduro World Cup in 2007/08, where he took two podiums and resulted third in points. In 2008/09 he got three podiums and ended fourth in the standings. The rider resulted sixth in 2009/10 with a best result of third. The Finn won a race and collected three podiums, to end third in points.

Mika Ahola announced his retirement from enduro racing on New Year's Day 2012. Ahola died of internal injuries on 15 January 2012 at a hospital in Barcelona, a few weeks after crashing while training in Girona, Spain.

Career summary

ISDE

References

1974 births
2012 deaths
Enduro riders
Finnish motorcycle racers
Finnish expatriate sportspeople in Spain
Motorcycle racers who died while racing
Sport deaths in Spain